Actuate Corporation is a publicly traded reporting, analytics and customer communications software company based in San Mateo, California, part of the San Francisco Bay Area and Silicon Valley. The company’s software is intended for use in the finance, government, manufacturing, telecommunications, and healthcare industries, among others.

History 
Actuate Corporation was founded in 1993.

The company is known for its creation of the open source Eclipse BIRT business data reporting project launched by the Eclipse Foundation in 2004. 

BIRT iHub F-Type is a freemium software product released by Actuate on July 10, 2014.  

In 2015, Actuate Corporation was acquired by OpenText for approximately $163 million.

Locations 
Actuate Corporation had offices across the U.S. and in Toronto, London, Paris, Frankfurt, Barcelona, Fribourg, Singapore, Tokyo and Sydney.

References

Further reading
Actuate acquires legodo ag https://www.constellationr.com/content/actuate-acquires-legodo-ag
Actuate acquires Quiterian http://www.mrweb.com/drno/news16288.htm
Actuate acquires Xenos http://www.destinationcrm.com/Articles/CRM-News/Daily-News/Actuate-Releases-Enhanced-Reporting-Acquires-Xenos-Group-60285.aspx
The story of Actuate's initial public offering: 

Business intelligence companies
Analytics companies
Eclipse technology
Free software companies
Software companies based in the San Francisco Bay Area
Companies formerly listed on the Nasdaq
Companies based in San Mateo, California
Companies established in 1993
1993 establishments in California
Defunct software companies of the United States